Dark Mist is a downloadable game on the PlayStation Store.

Gameplay
 Dark Mist is an action-adventure game. You play as the warrior of light, Artemis, shooting down the forces of darkness. The game is divided into different dungeons, which the hero must hack and slash his way through. The game has an overhead vantage point, making it stylistically similar to the dungeon levels in the first Legend of Zelda game. The hero begins with three "stars" of energy, which are replenished by collecting hearts.  In addition to hearts, diamonds, keys and crescent moons are also collected.  Dark Mist uses the Sixaxis controls to perform a spinning attack that blows back enemies and clears the blinding 'dark mist' from your path.  Dark Mist has a resolution of 720p and is available for download from the Japanese and European PSN stores.

Depths of Darkness Expansion 
On the 28 February 2008 an expansion pack for Dark Mist was released entitled Depths of Darkness.  The expansion includes twelve new single player levels, three new playable characters and a new offline and online multiplayer mode and is available to download from the Hong Kong and Japanese PSN store.

Reception 

Dark Mist received mixed reviews from critics upon release. The game holds a score of 70.33% on GameRankings based on 12 reviews.

References

External links 
 official Japanese website

2007 video games
Game Republic games
PlayStation 3 games
PlayStation 3-only games
PlayStation Network games
Sony Interactive Entertainment games
Video games developed in Japan
Video games featuring female protagonists
Video games with expansion packs
Single-player video games